Bernhard Hennen (born 1966 in Krefeld) is a German writer of fantasy literature.

He is best known internationally for his series Die Elfen ("The Elves", since 2004), which has been translated into a number of European languages.

Career 
He graduated from the University of Cologne. He worked as a journalist for various newspapers and radio stations.

He began his writing career with Das Jahr des Greifen which he co-authored with Wolfgang Hohlbein in 1994. He followed up with four historical novels published 1996–1999 before returning to the fantasy genre in the 2000s. 

He also wrote for the role-playing game The Dark Eye.

Personal life 
He is married, has two children, and lives again in Krefeld since 2000.

Bibliography 
 1996 - Der Tempelmord
 1996 - Der Flötenspieler
 1998 - Die Husarin
 1999 - Die Könige der ersten Nacht
 2001 - Nebenan
 2001 - Das Jahr des Greifen, together with Wolfgang Hohlbein (a The Dark Eye-novel)
 2002 - Der Wahrträumer. Gezeitenwelt 1
 2003 - Im Schatten des Raben (a The Dark Eye-novel)
 2004 - Das Geheimnis der Gezeitenwelt - Die Saga von der Wiedergeburt der Magie
 2005 - Alica und die Dunkle Königin
 2007 - Rabensturm (a The Dark Eye-novel)

Die Elfen
Bernhard Hennens Die Elfen series was translated into Dutch (De Elfen), Italian (Gli Elfi), French (Les Elfes), Czech (Elfové), Spanish (Los Elfos), Portuguese (Os Elfos), Russian (Эльфы), Ukrainian (Ельфи) and English (The Elven).
 2004 - Die Elfen, together with James A. Sullivan
 Translated into English as The Elven
 2005 - Elfenwinter
 Translated into English in two parts: Elven Winter and Elven Queen
 2006 - Elfenlicht
 2009 - Elfenlied
 2009 - Elfenkönigin
 2010 - Elfenwelten
 2017 - Elfenmacht
Drachenelfen
 2011 - Drachenelfen
 2012 - Drachenelfen - Die Windgängerin
 2013 - Drachenelfen - Die gefesselte Göttin
 2015 - Drachenelfen - Die letzten Eiskrieger
 2016 - Drachenelfen - Himmel in Flammen

Elfenritter
 2007 - Elfenritter - Die Ordensburg
 2008 - Elfenritter - Die Albenmark
 2008 - Elfenritter - Das Fjordland

Die Phileasson-Saga (together with Robert Corvus)
 2016 – Die Phileasson-Saga – Nordwärts
 2016 – Die Phileasson-Saga – Himmelsturm
 2016 – Die Phileasson-Saga – Die Wölfin
 2017 – Die Phileasson-Saga – Silberflamme
 2018 – Die Phileasson-Saga – Schlangengrab
 2018 – Die Phileasson-Saga – Totenmeer
 2019 – Die Phileasson-Saga – Rosentempel
 2020 – Die Phileasson-Saga – Elfenkrieg
 2020 – Die Phileasson-Saga – Echsengötter
 2022 – Die Phileasson-Saga – Nebelinseln

References

External links
bernhard-hennen.de
 
2009 interview at epenschmiede.de

1966 births
Living people
German fantasy writers
German male writers